Chinna is a 1994 Indian Kannada-language action film produced, written, directed and enacted by V. Ravichandran. The cast includes Yamuna, Puneet Issar, Mukhyamantri Chandru, Lokanath, and Pandari Bai. Ravichandran plays the role of a cop happily settled with his wife and suddenly becomes aware of his ancestral property existence in the middle of a forest occupied by the local goons. This is the only Kannada film of Sabu Cyril.
The music was composed by Hamsalekha and was declared a musical hit upon release.

Cast
 Ravichandran as Chinna
 Yamuna
 Puneet Issar as Vishwa 
 Silk Smitha 
 Pandari Bai 
 Lokanath
 Umashree
 Mukhyamantri Chandru
 Sundar Krishna Urs
 B. V. Radha
 Ramesh Bhat
 Lohithaswa as Chief Minister 
 Master Anand
 Ponnambalam
 Karikalan vasanth as Forest Bandit Rayappa 
 Sathyajith as Jailor
 H.M.T. Nandha as Beggar 
 Rathnakar 
 Master Deepak 
 Bharath Kumar 
 Bank Suresh
 Rocket Vikram 
 Stunt Devu 
 Guru Murthy
 Fayaz Khan

Soundtrack
All music composed and all songs written by Hamsalekha.

Reception
The music, composed by Hamsalekha was well received and the audio sales hit a record high.

References

External links
 Chinna online movie

1990s Kannada-language films
1994 films
Films scored by Hamsalekha
Indian romantic action films
1990s romantic action films

kn:ಚಿನ್ನ